Sheldon Goldman (born September 18, 1939) is a professor of political science at the University of Massachusetts Amherst and the author of Picking Federal Judges (1997, 1999) and The Federal Courts as a Political System, (3rd ed., 1985).  He also has written other works and numerous articles in professional journals including American Political Science Review, Journal of Politics, and Judicature and chapters in books. He is chair of the Law and Courts Section of the American Political Science Association, 2000–2001; and a member of the Editorial Board, Law & Politics Book Review, 1994–1997; American Political Science Review, 1981–1985, and American Journal of Political Science, 1979–1982.

Goldman received a Lifetime Achievement Award from the Law and Courts Section of the American Political Science Association in 2006.

External links 
  UMass News and Events
  UMass-Amherst Department of Political Science Faculty
  UMass College of Social and Behavioral Sciences

University of Massachusetts Amherst faculty
American political scientists
Living people
1939 births
20th-century American Jews
21st-century American Jews